Dissard may refer to:

 Clotilde Dissard (1873-1919), French journalist, feminist
 Marianne Dissard (born 1969), French singer, lyricist, author, filmmaker 
 Marie-Louise Dissard (1881-1957), member of the French Resistance
 Paul Dissard (1852–1926), French art historian